Kgope is a village in Kweneng District of Botswana. The village is located 50 km north of Gaborone, the capital of Botswana, and it has a primary school. The population of Kgope was 507 in 2001 census.

References

Kweneng District
Villages in Botswana